William Shemin (October 14, 1896 – August 15, 1973) was a Sergeant in the U.S. Army during World War I. He was  awarded the Medal of Honor for bravery in action at Vesle River, near Bazoches, France. On June 2, 2015, Elsie Shemin-Roth and her sister Ina Bass accepted the nation's highest military award for valor on behalf of their father from President Barack Obama at the White House. Shemin was assigned to Company G, 47th Infantry Regiment, 4th Division, American Expeditionary Forces.

Biography 
William "Bill" Shemin was born in Bayonne, New Jersey. During his teenage years, he played semi-pro baseball. He graduated from the New York State Ranger School in 1914, and went on to work as a forester in Bayonne. Shemin enlisted in the Army, October 2, 1917. Upon completion of basic training at Camp Greene, North Carolina, he was assigned as a rifleman to Company G, 47th Infantry Regiment, 4th Infantry Division, American Expeditionary Forces, in France.

While serving as a rifleman from August 7–9, 1918, Shemin left the cover of his platoon's trench and crossed open space, repeatedly exposing himself to heavy machine gun and rifle fire to rescue the wounded. After officers and senior non-commissioned officers had become casualties, Shemin took command of the platoon and displayed great initiative under fire, until he was wounded on August 9.  It was for this action that Shemin was originally awarded the Distinguished Service Cross on December 19, 1919.  Some 96 years later, this Distinguished Service Cross award would be upgraded to the Medal of Honor.  Shemin was hospitalized for three months as a result of the wounds he suffered in this action which included those from shrapnel and a machine gun bullet that pierced his helmet and lodged behind his left ear.  Following his recovery, he served on light duty as part of the Army occupation in Germany and Belgium until he completed his tour.  Shemin received the Purple Heart for his combat wounds.

Shemin was honorably discharged in August 1919, and went on to get a degree from the New York State College of Forestry at Syracuse University. After graduation, he started a greenhouse and landscaping business in the Bronx, New York, where he raised three children. Shemin died in 1973.

Medal of Honor Citation

Military Awards 
Shemin's military decorations and awards include:

See also
List of Medal of Honor recipients
List of Jewish Medal of Honor recipients
List of Medal of Honor recipients for World War I

References

Bibliography

External links

1896 births
1973 deaths
United States Army Medal of Honor recipients
United States Army non-commissioned officers
People from the Bronx
Jewish Medal of Honor recipients
World War I recipients of the Medal of Honor
State University of New York College of Environmental Science and Forestry alumni
United States Army personnel of World War I
20th-century American Jews
Military personnel from New Jersey
Syracuse University alumni
Burials in New York (state)